Jimmy James OAM (1913–1991) was an Aboriginal Australian and member of the Pitjantjatjara people, who was best known as an Aboriginal tracker who helped South Australian Police in tracking criminals over a forty-year period.

Background
James was born near Ernabella (now Pukatja) in northern South Australia to his Warlawurru (Eagle-Hawk) and Kaarnka (Black Crow). His death certificate recorded his date of birth as 7 March 1910, although he also sometimes claimed to be born in 1913. He spent his late childhood at the Ooldea Mission.

In 1945, he was restrained while trying to leave his workplace with four coworkers for the Port Pirie police station. The grievance related to 8 months of unpaid wages from their employer - the Mount Dare station. The manager, was arrested and later found guilty of assault and maltreatment of Aborigines).

In January 1946, James and the other workers then moved to the South Australian Riverland, where he assisted in the establishment of the new Gerard Mission.

Tracking 
In 1948, James began his career as a tracker for police and landowners, and gained much of his reputation tracking criminals (including arsonists, poachers and escapees) and lost persons. The Sundown murders in 1957 and Pine Valley murder in 1958 were his most publicised cases.

In 1966, he found nine-year-old Wendy Pfeiffer after she was abducted near Mylor, stabbed, and left for dead in the woods. He led this man-hunt alongside Daniel Moodoo. In January 2019, SBS also launched an interactive website which recounts the story of the Pfeiffer case.

In 1982, he found the dangerous escapee James Beauregard-Smith.

Death 
In 1987, he suffered several strokes that crippled him. He died on 27 October 1991. He is buried with his family in the Gerard Reserve Cemetery at the Gerard Mission.

After his death, a granite memorial was erected in Berri, South Australia. In January 2019, SBS also launched an interactive website which recounts the story of the Pfeiffer case.

Awards
1984: Medal of the Order of Australia
1983: South Australian Aboriginal Person of the Year in 1983
Gold medallion given by the family of Wendy Pfeiffer.

Personal life
James married Lilian Disher on 22 February 1947 at the Gerard Mission, giving his age as 21. Disher was the unofficial adopted daughter of Jimmy James, another tracker from whom James took his occidental name. They had four children but James outlived all of them due to issues such as illness and alcoholism.

References

Further reading
 

Recipients of the Medal of the Order of Australia
People from South Australia
1913 births
1991 deaths
Crime in South Australia
Pitjantjatjara people
Australian Aboriginal trackers